The 1st Bangsamoro Transition Authority (BTA) Parliament, is the first interim Bangsamoro Parliament, the legislature of the transitional regional government of Bangsamoro.

It is composed of members of the Bangsamoro Transition Authority which itself was constituted on February 22, 2019 when its first set of members took their oath. The inaugural session began on March 29, 2019 and ended on April 23, 2020. At the start of the first regular session, the parliament had 75 members.

The second regular session began on June 16, 2020. The third session began on June 15, 2021. The fourth session began on June 14, 2022.

The fourth session was abruptly ended when a new set of BTA officials were appointed in August 12, 2022 and the 2nd interim parliament held its inaugural session on September 15, 2022.

Leadership

Composition

It is legislated that the Moro Islamic Liberation Front will lead the BTA “without prejudice to the participation of the Moro National Liberation Front (MNLF) in its membership.” Elected officials of the ARMM whose terms were set to end until June 30, 2019 served as part of the body until that date. These officials are the regional governor, the vice governor and the members of the 24-seat Regional Legislative Assembly. Eighty members of the interim body were appointed by the Philippine government, 41 were nominated by the MILF, and the remaining were selected by the national government. Only 76 out of 80 nominees took their oath as BTA members by February 22, 2019.

On the first day of the parliament's first regular session on March 29, 2019, there were 75 regular members, 40 of whom were MILF nominees and 35 national government nominees. BTA member Ghazali Jaafar died prior and the government has not filled in four vacant seats. 23 ARMM elected officials also temporarily served as part of the parliament. ARMM Governor Mujiv Hataman opted out from being part of the BTA, a member of the 24-seat ARMM Regional Legislative Assembly died and another assemblyman, Khadafeh Mangudadatu was nominated as a regular member by the national government. The vice governor and the remaining 22 members of the assembly have not taken their oaths as BTA members.

The interim parliament was originally set to end its mandate in 2022. However the impact of the COVID-19 pandemic in the region has been cited as justification, which led to the non-passage of a Bangsamoro Electoral Code led to lobbying by the Bangsamoro regional government and some advocacy groups for the national government to postpone the elections. In order for the elections to be postponed, the Bangsamoro Organic Law needs to be amended. The campaign was successful after President Rodrigo Duterte signed into law on October 28, 2021 the bill postponing the elections to 2025.

When the law postponing the elections was being deliberated, the possibility of revising the manner of allocation of seats in the interim parliament was raised. In the Senate it was proposed that the provincial governors of Bangsamoro given the power to nominate members in the interim parliament. The law also gave President Duterte to appoint new set of members for the parliament before his term expires in 2022.

In February 2022, the Security, Justice and Peace Cabinet Cluster advised Duterte to retain the existing parliament members which the president approved. Duterte retained the 41 seats allocated to MILF nominees.

The body running the parliament under President Duterte would be informally and retroactively be referred to as "BTA1".

Graphical representation
These are graphical representations of the Bangsamoro Transition Authority showing a comparison of its composition after the initial set of officers were sworn-in in 2019 and its current make up:

  

Note this is not the official seating plan of the Bangsamoro Parliament.

List of MPs

Former MPs 
The last governor and the vice governor of the Autonomous Region in Muslim Mindanao (ARMM) as well as members of the 9th ARMM Regional Legislative Assembly were allowed to become part of the BTA until June 30, 2019 which was supposed to be the end of their original elective post.

However none of the officials, save for one nominated assembly member, took oath as members of the BTA. ARMM Regional Governor Mujiv Hataman opted out from joining the BTA. Vice Governor Haroun Lucman  and the remaining 22 members of the 9th Assembly were also not part of the parliament.

The list does not include members who were not reappointed to the BTA by President Bongbong Marcos on August 12, 2022 who became part of the 2nd parliament which held its inaugural session on September 15, 2022.

Changes

References

 
Bangsamoro Transition Authority